Lenon Hoyte (4 July 1905 – 1 August 1999) was an American collector of antique dolls and toys. She was best known for founding Aunt Len's Doll and Toy Museum in New York City.

References

1905 births
1999 deaths
Antiques experts
American company founders